Pine High School is located near Franklinton, Louisiana, United States, and is a part of the Washington Parish School Board. Its current principal is Ramona Thomas. 

The school mascot is the Raider.

History
The school was damaged during Hurricane Katrina and re-opened in 2006 at a new site about a mile away from the old one. 

The school's newly built football stadium was completed in 2010.

Athletics
Pine Senior High athletics competes in the LHSAA.

Notable alumni
Derrick Dillon, professional football player for the New York Giants and college football player for LSU Tigers

References

External links
Pine High School website

Public high schools in Louisiana
Public middle schools in Louisiana
Schools in Washington Parish, Louisiana